Erik Rosskopf (born May 25, 1965) is a swimmer who represented the United States Virgin Islands. He competed in four events at the 1984 Summer Olympics.

References

External links
 

1965 births
Living people
United States Virgin Islands male swimmers
Pan American Games competitors for the United States Virgin Islands
Swimmers at the 1979 Pan American Games
Olympic swimmers of the United States Virgin Islands
Swimmers at the 1984 Summer Olympics
Swimmers from Los Angeles